Chuadanga-2 is a constituency represented in the Jatiya Sangsad (National Parliament) of Bangladesh since 2008 by Md. Ali Azgar of the Awami League.

Boundaries 
The constituency encompasses Damurhuda and Jibannagar  upazilas, and four union parishads of Chuadanga Sadar Upazila: Begumpur, Nehalpur, Garaitupi and Titudah Union.

History 
The constituency was created in 1984 from a Kushtia constituency when the former Kushtia District was split into three districts: Meherpur, Kushtia, and Chuadanga.

Members of Parliament

Elections

Elections in the 2010s

Elections in the 2000s

Elections in the 1990s

References

External links
 

Parliamentary constituencies in Bangladesh
Chuadanga District